The 2009–10 Slovenian Second League season started on 9 August 2009 and ended on 23 May 2010. Each team played a total of 27 matches.

Clubs

League standing

See also
2009–10 Slovenian PrvaLiga
2009–10 Slovenian Third League

References
NZS archive

External links
Football Association of Slovenia 

Slovenian Second League seasons
2009–10 in Slovenian football
Slovenia